Miyauchi may refer to:

Miyauchi (surname), a Japanese surname
Miyauchi, Yamagata, a former town in Higashiokitama District, Yamagata Prefecture, Japan
Miyauchi Station (disambiguation), multiple train stations
26319 Miyauchi, a main-belt asteroid